These hits topped the Ultratop 50 charts in 2003 (see 2003 in music).

See also
2003 in music

References

2003 in Belgium
2003 record charts
2003